Habo may refer to:

Places
 Habo, a town in Sweden
 Habo, a town in Caluula district, Somalia
 Habo Municipality, a municipality in Jönköping County, Sweden

Other
 Habbo, a social networking hotel game site
 Habonim, a Zionist youth movement